Crawford Lake is a lake in geographic Haultain Township in the Montreal River and Ottawa River drainage basins in Timiskaming District, Ontario, Canada. A short unnamed creek flows in at the north. The primary outflow, at the south, is an unnamed creek towards Lost Lake, which flows via Calcite Creek, Sydney Creek and the Montreal River to Lake Timiskaming on the Ottawa River.

References

Lakes of Timiskaming District